Eucalyptus squamosa, commonly known as scaly bark, is a species of small to medium-sized tree that is endemic to the Sydney region in New South Wales. It has rough, tessellated, fibrous or flaky bark, lance-shaped or curved adult leaves, flower buds in groups of seven, nine or eleven, white flowers and cup-shaped or hemispherical fruit.

Description 
It has rough,  grey or reddish brown, tessellated fibrous or flaky bark on the trunk and branches. Flowering occurs from October to December and the flowers are white.

Taxonomy and naming
Eucalyptus squamosa was first formally described in 1898 by Joseph Maiden and Henry Deane in Proceedings of the Linnean Society of New South Wales. The specific epithet (squamosa) is from the Latin word squamosus, meaning "scaly", referring to the bark of this species.

Distribution and habitat
Scaly bark grows in sclerophyll woodland, where soil accumulates in depressions on the sandstone on and around sandstone plateaus, often on lateritic soils. It occurs in the Sydney region, between the Putty and Broke districts and the Royal National Park.

References

squamosa
Myrtales of Australia
Flora of New South Wales
Trees of Australia
Plants described in 1898